Ignacio "Nacho" Gil de Pareja Vicent (born 9 September 1995) is a Spanish professional footballer who plays for New England Revolution in Major League Soccer. Primarily deployed as a attacking midfielder, he can also play as a left winger.

Formed at Valencia, he made 22 La Liga appearances for them and for Las Palmas, while playing over 100 Segunda División games for three clubs.

Club career

Valencia
Born in Valencia, Gil joined hometown club Valencia CF's youth setup in 2002 at the age of seven. He made his senior debut with the reserves on 5 January 2014, starting in a 1–0 Segunda División B away loss against CE L'Hospitalet.

Gil was promoted to the B team ahead of the 2014–15 season, and scored his first senior goal on 7 December 2014 in a 1–0 away win over CF Reus Deportiu. He featured regularly for the side the following years, whilst being utilised as a forward during the 2016–17 campaign.

Gil had a loan move to Deportivo Alavés cancelled. He rejected an offer from Villarreal CF in August 2016, but submitted a transfer request to his parent club in January 2017, which was refused. Shortly after, he was called up to train with the main squad by manager Voro.

Gil made his first-team and La Liga debut on 25 February 2017, coming on as a late substitute for Mario Suárez in a 2–1 away defeat to Alavés. On 4 May, he renewed his contract until 2020.

On 25 January 2018, Gil was loaned to UD Las Palmas of the same league for six months. On 10 September, he moved to Segunda División's Elche CF also in a temporary deal.

Ponferradina
Gil terminated his contract with Valencia on 19 July 2019, and signed for second division team SD Ponferradina just hours later. 

He played 35 matches in all competitions during his spell, scoring his only goal on 22 December 2019 in the 3–2 away victory against UD Almería.

Cartagena
On 18 August 2020, agreed to a two-year deal at FC Cartagena, newly promoted to the second tier. He scored once – in a 4–1 loss at Sporting de Gijón on 26 March 2022– also being sent off as a late substitute in a 1–0 away win over league leaders UD Almería on 2 January that year.

Gil was released at the end of his contract in June 2022, as the club declined an extension.

New England Revolution 
On 18 August 2022, Gil joined New England Revolution of Major League Soccer. He made his debut on 10 September as a late substitute in a 2–1 loss at the New York Red Bulls.

Personal life
Gil's elder brother, Carles, is also a footballer and an attacking midfielder. He also came through at Valencia, and the pair were teammates at New England.

References

External links

Stats and bio at CiberChe 

1995 births
Living people
Spanish footballers
Footballers from Valencia (city)
Association football midfielders
La Liga players
Segunda División players
Segunda División B players
Valencia CF Mestalla footballers
Valencia CF players
UD Las Palmas players
Elche CF players
SD Ponferradina players
FC Cartagena footballers
Major League Soccer players
New England Revolution players
Spanish expatriate footballers
Expatriate soccer players in the United States
Spanish expatriate sportspeople in the United States